Falcimala is a genus of moths of the family Noctuidae. The genus was erected by George Hampson in 1895.

Species
Falcimala acosmopis (Turner, 1902) Australia
Falcimala angulifalcis Rothschild, 1915 New Guinea
Falcimala atrata (Butler, 1889) Dharmsala
Falcimala diacia C. Swinhoe, 1905 Khasia Hills
Falcimala lativitta (Moore, 1882) Darjeeling
Falcimala morapanoides Rothschild, 1915 New Guinea
Falcimala ochrealis Hampson, 1896 Bhutan
Falcimala sassana Strand, 1918 Congo

References

Herminiinae
Moth genera